Ti Lian Ker (born 25 October 1962) is a Malaysian politician who has served as Senator since May 2020. He served as the Deputy Minister of Youth and Sports in the Barisan Nasional (BN) administration under former Prime Minister Ismail Sabri Yaakob and former Minister Ahmad Faizal Azumu from August 2021 to the collapse of the BN administration in November 2022 and Deputy Minister of National Unity in the Perikatan Nasional (PN) administration under Prime Minister Muhyiddin Yassin and former Minister Halimah Mohamed Sadique from May 2020 to the collapse of the PN administration in August 2021 as well as Member of the Pahang State Legislative Assembly (MLA) for Teruntum from March 2004 to March 2008 and for Indera Mahkota from April 1995 to March 2004. He is a member of the Malaysian Chinese Association (MCA), a component party of the BN coalition. He has also served as the Vice President of MCA since November 2018.

Controversy
On 22 September 2022, Ti Lian Ker asked Malaysians to be forgiving to the health condition of incarcerated former prime minister Najib Razak. PKR deputy information chief Chua Wei Kiat reminded him not to feed ‘perverse idea’ to the rakyat. DAP chairman Lim Guan Eng challenged MCA to prove its allegations that disgraced Najib Razak is suffering from torture behind bars at the Kajang Prison.

Najib was convicted of stealing RM42 million from former 1MDB subsidiary SRC International Sdn Bhd and sent to prison on August 23 to serve a 12-year jail sentence. He was also fined RM210 million and will have to serve another five years if he does not pay the amount.

Election results

Honours
  :
  Companion of the Order of the Defender of the Realm (JMN) (2010)
  :
  Knight Companion of the Order of the Crown of Pahang (DIMP) – Dato' (2004)
  Knight Companion of the Order of Sultan Ahmad Shah of Pahang (DSAP) – Dato' (2010)
  Grand Knight of the Order of Sultan Ahmad Shah of Pahang (SSAP) – Dato' Sri (2014)

References

1962 births
Living people
People from Pahang
Malaysian people of Chinese descent
Malaysian Chinese Association politicians
Members of the Dewan Negara
Members of the Pahang State Legislative Assembly
21st-century Malaysian politicians
Companions of the Order of the Defender of the Realm